Nature Via Nurture: Genes, Experience, and What Makes us Human is a 2003 book by Matt Ridley, in which Ridley discusses the interaction between environment and genes and how they affect human development.  It was the 2003 winner of the National Academies Communication Award for best creative work that helps the public understanding of topics in science, engineering or medicine.

Reviews

Publication
 
 Republished as The Agile Gene: How Nature Turns on Nurture.

Books by Matt Ridley
Genetics books
HarperCollins books
2003 non-fiction books